Gaetano Savio (18 November 1937 – 25 July 2004), better known as Totò Savio, was an Italian composer, lyricist, producer, guitarist and occasional singer.

Early life 
Born in Naples, Savio started playing guitar at six years old, and at 13 he won a radio contest for guitarists. In 1955 he became a member of the musical group of Marino Marini, with whom he toured in Europe and Africa. In 1961 he founded a band that bore his name, with whom he toured across Italy and participated to several radio and television programs.

Career 
In the second half of the 1960s Savio started composing songs, getting his first hit in 1967, Little Tony's "Cuore matto". In 1973 he co-founded the comedy group Squallor, serving as composer and also occasionally performing as a singer. Other hits written by Savio include Renato dei Profeti's "Lady Barbara", Massimo Ranieri's "Vent'anni" and "Erba di casa mia" (winning songs of the 1970 and 1972 editions of Canzonissima), Loretta Goggi's "Maledetta primavera", Michele Zarrillo's "Una rosa blu", I Camaleonti's "Perchè ti amo" (winning song of the 1973 Un disco per l'estate Festival), Il Giardino dei Semplici's "Miele".

References

External links

 

1937 births
2004 deaths
Musicians from Naples
Italian lyricists
Italian male composers
Italian songwriters
Male songwriters
Italian record producers
20th-century Italian male singers
Italian pop singers